The Frauen DFB-Pokal 1991–92 was the 12th season of the cup competition, Germany's second-most important title in women's football. In the final which was held in Berlin on 23 June 1992 FSV Frankfurt defeated TSV Siegen 1–0, thus claiming their third cup title.

In this edition of the cup for the first time games that were a draw after extra time were not repeated. A penalty shootout decided the game instead. Also for the first time all clubs from the Bundesliga were automatically qualified and clubs from the former GDR were eligible to compete in the DFB-Pokal. Finally Gertrud Regus became the first woman to be the referee in a DFB-Pokal final.

First round 

Several clubs had byes in the first round. Those clubs were automatically qualified for the 2nd round of the cup.

Second round

Third round

Quarter-finals

Semi-finals

Final

See also 
 Bundesliga 1991–92
 1991–92 DFB-Pokal men's competition

References 

DFB-Pokal Frauen seasons
Pokal
Fra